Theloderma leporosum (Malaya bug-eyed frog) is a species of frog in the family Rhacophoridae.
It is found in Peninsular Malaysia and Sumatra (Indonesia).

Theloderma leporosum inhabits evergreen lowland and montane rainforests. In Malaysia they inhabit primary and old secondary forests at high elevations. Ongoing habitat loss due to logging is a threat to this species.

Theloderma leporosum is the largest and most elusive of the four Theloderma species in Peninsular Malaysia. They have brown dorsum, greyish brown iris, and orangish webbing on hind feet. Underside of their body and inner side of limbs are pale-blue to white with black reticulations.

References

External links
Amphibian and Reptiles of Peninsular Malaysia - Theloderma leprosum (sic)

leporosum
Amphibians of Indonesia
Amphibians of Malaysia
Taxonomy articles created by Polbot
Amphibians described in 1838